Belogorsk is an urban locality (an urban-type settlement) in Tisulsky District of Kemerovo Oblast, Russia, located on the eastern spurs of the Kuznetsk Alatau mountain range. Population:    4,400 (1969).

References

Urban-type settlements in Kemerovo Oblast